Dead in My Arms is the debut studio album by American deathcore band Carnifex. It was released on July 12, 2007 through This City Is Burning Records. It is the band's only album with bassist Steve McMahon, as he left shortly after the album's release, and was replaced by Fred Calderon, who has played on all of Carnifex's albums since then. It was also the band's only album recorded as quartet until the release of Graveside Confessions in 2021.

The album is released as both a jewel case and a digipak. The jewel case version of the album is rarer than the digipak.

Background
Carnifex were briefly signed to This City Is Burning in 2007, during so the group wrote and recorded Dead in My Arms during the proceeding months. Upon the album's release in June 2007, it managed to sell over 5,000 copies in its first week despite very limited publicity. After its release, the sales of the album more than doubled amongst the summer of that year. "Collaborating Like Killers", "Love Lies in Ashes" "Slit Wrist Savior" and "Hope Dies with the Decadent" were re-recorded tracks that had previously been included on the band's first EP, Love Lies in Ashes.

The original distributed versions of the album sold on iTunes and copies at the band's concerts had the song "These Thoughts Become Cages" missing due to a marketing idea from This City Is Burning Records who placed the song only on the store bought versions of the album.

The same version that includes the "These Thoughts Become Cages" track, also features enhanced content on the disc and includes the controversial music video for "Lie to My Face" along with other extras.

Track listing

Personnel
Carnifex
Scott Lewis - vocals
Cory Arford - guitars
Steve McMahon - bass
Shawn Cameron - drums, keyboards

Production
Produced by Chris "Zeuss" Harris
Mixed and mastered by Dave Swanson

References 

2007 debut albums
Carnifex (band) albums
Albums produced by Chris "Zeuss" Harris